The following is a list of all suspensions and fines enforced in the National Hockey League (NHL) during the 2022–23 NHL season. It lists which players or coaches of what team have been punished for which offense and the amount of punishment they have received.

Players' money forfeited due to suspension or fine goes to the Players' Emergency Assistance Fund, while money forfeited by coaches, staff or organizations as a whole goes to the NHL Foundation.

Suspensions
Based on each player's average annual salary, divided by number of days in the season (185) for non-repeat offenders and games (82) for repeat offenders, salary will be forfeited for the term of their suspension.

† - suspension covered at least one 2022 NHL preseason game

Notes
1. All figures are in US dollars.

Fines
Players can be fined up to 50% of one day's salary, up to a maximum of $10,000.00 for their first offense, and $15,000.00 for any subsequent offenses (player had been fined in the 12 months prior to this fine). Coaches, non-playing personnel, and teams are not restricted to such maximums, though can still be treated as repeat offenders.

Fines for players/coaches fined for diving/embellishment are structured uniquely and are only handed out after non-publicized warnings are given to the player/coach for their first offense. For more details on diving/embellishment fines:

 For coach incident totals, each citation issued to a player on his club counts toward his total.
 All figures are in US dollars.

Fines listed in italics indicate that was the maximum allowed fine.
 - Player was considered a repeat offender under the terms of the Collective Bargaining Agreement (player had been fined in the 12 months prior to this fine)

Notes
1. All figures are in US dollars.
2. Marchment was issued his first citation following an incident on November 26, 2022.

Further reading

See also 
 2021–22 NHL suspensions and fines

 2022 in sports
 2023 in sports
 2022–23 NHL season
 2022–23 NHL transactions

References

External links
NHL Collective Bargaining Agreement

Suspension and Fines
National Hockey League suspensions and fines